Korita is a small village in the hills between Idrija and Žiri in Slovenia. It lies within the Municipality of Idrija in the traditional Inner Carniola region.

References

External links 

Korita on Geopedia

Populated places in the Municipality of Idrija